Franz Joseph I or Francis Joseph I (18 August 1830 – 21 November 1916) was Emperor of Austria, King of Hungary, and the other states of the Habsburg monarchy from 2 December 1848 until his death on 21 November 1916. In the early part of his reign, his realms and territories were referred to as the Austrian Empire, but were reconstituted as the dual monarchy of the Austro-Hungarian Empire in 1867.  From 1 May 1850 to 24 August 1866, he was also president of the German Confederation.

In December 1848, Franz Joseph's uncle Emperor Ferdinand abdicated the throne at Olomouc, as part of Minister President Felix zu Schwarzenberg's plan to end the Revolutions of 1848 in Hungary. Franz Joseph (his father having renounced his rights) then acceded to the throne. Largely considered to be a reactionary, he spent his early reign resisting constitutionalism in his domains. The Austrian Empire was forced to cede its influence over Tuscany and most of its claim to Lombardy–Venetia to the Kingdom of Sardinia, following the Second Italian War of Independence in 1859 and the Third Italian War of Independence in 1866. Although Franz Joseph ceded no territory to the Kingdom of Prussia after the Austrian defeat in the Austro-Prussian War, the Peace of Prague (23 August 1866) settled the German Question in favour of Prussia, which prevented the unification of Germany from occurring under the House of Habsburg.

Franz Joseph was troubled by nationalism during his entire reign. He concluded the Austro-Hungarian Compromise of 1867, which granted greater autonomy to Hungary and created the dual monarchy of Austria-Hungary. He ruled peacefully for the next 45 years, but personally suffered the tragedies of the execution of his brother Emperor Maximilian I of Mexico in 1867, the suicide of his son Crown Prince Rudolf in 1889, the assassination of his wife Empress Elisabeth ("Sisi") in 1898, and the assassination of his nephew and heir-presumptive, Archduke Franz Ferdinand, in 1914. 

After the Austro-Prussian War, Austria-Hungary turned its attention to the Balkans, which was a hotspot of international tension because of conflicting interests of Austria with not only the Ottoman but also the Russian Empire. The Bosnian Crisis was a result of Franz Joseph's annexation in 1908 of Bosnia and Herzegovina, which had already been occupied by his troops since the Congress of Berlin (1878). On 28 June 1914, the assassination of his nephew Franz Ferdinand in Sarajevo resulted in Austria-Hungary's declaration of war against the Kingdom of Serbia, which was an ally of the Russian Empire. That activated a system of alliances declaring war on each other, which resulted in World War I. The Emperor died in 1916, after ruling his domains for almost 68 years. He was succeeded by his grandnephew Charles I & IV.

Early life

Franz Joseph was born 18 August 1830 in the Schönbrunn Palace in Vienna (on the 65th anniversary of the death of Francis of Lorraine) as the eldest son of Archduke Franz Karl (the younger son of Holy Roman Emperor Francis II), and his wife Princess Sophie of Bavaria. Because his uncle, reigning from 1835 as the Emperor Ferdinand, was weak-minded, and his father unambitious and retiring, the mother of the young Archduke "Franzi" brought him up as a future Emperor, with emphasis on devotion, responsibility and diligence.

Since no issue from the marriage of the heir to the throne were expected, Archduke Ferdinand (emperor from 1835), his next elder brother Franz Karl was to continue the succession of the Habsburgs, which is why the birth of his son Franz Joseph at the Viennese court was given special importance. Franz Karl was physically as well as mentally of weak constitution and was therefore hardly suitable for a reign. For this reason, Franz Joseph was consistently built up as a potential successor to the imperial throne by his politically ambitious mother from early childhood.

Up to the age of seven, little "Franzi" was brought up in the care of the nanny ("Aja") Louise von Sturmfeder. Then the "state education" began, the central contents of which were "sense of duty", religiosity and dynastic awareness. The theologian Joseph Othmar von Rauscher conveyed to him the inviolable understanding of rulership of divine origin (divine grace), which is why no participation of the population in rulership in the form of parliaments is required.

The educators Heinrich Franz von Bombelles and Colonel Johann Baptist Coronini-Cronberg ordered Archduke Franz to study an enormous amount of time, which initially comprised 18 hours per week and was expanded to 50 hours per week by the age of 16. One of the main focuses of the lessons was language acquisition: in addition to French, the diplomatic language of the time, Latin and ancient Greek, Hungarian, Czech, Italian and Polish were the most important national languages of the monarchy. In addition, the Archduke received general education that was customary at the time (including mathematics, physics, history, geography), which was later supplemented by law and political science. Various forms of physical education completed the extensive program.  Franz Joseph came to idolise his grandfather, der Gute Kaiser Franz, who had died shortly before the former's fifth birthday, as the ideal monarch.

On his 13th birthday, Franz Joseph was appointed Colonel-Inhaber of Dragoon Regiment No. 3 and the focus of his training shifted to imparting basic strategic and tactical knowledge. From that point onward, army style dictated his personal fashionfor the rest of his life, he normally wore the uniform of a military officer. Franz Joseph was soon joined by three younger brothers: Archduke Ferdinand Maximilian (born 1832, the future Emperor Maximilian of Mexico); Archduke Karl Ludwig (born 1833, father of Archduke Franz Ferdinand of Austria), and Archduke Ludwig Viktor (born 1842), and a sister, Maria Anna (born 1835), who died at the age of four.

Revolutions of 1848

During the Revolutions of 1848, the Austrian Chancellor Prince Metternich resigned (March–April 1848). The young Archduke, who (it was widely expected) would soon succeed his uncle on the throne, was appointed Governor of Bohemia on 6 April 1848, but never took up the post. Sent instead to the front in Italy, he joined Field Marshal Radetzky on campaign on 29 April, receiving his baptism of fire on 5 May at Santa Lucia.

By all accounts, he handled his first military experience calmly and with dignity. Around the same time, the Imperial Family was fleeing revolutionary Vienna for the calmer setting of Innsbruck, in Tyrol. Called back from Italy, the Archduke joined the rest of his family at Innsbruck by mid-June. At Innsbruck at this time, Franz Joseph first met his cousin Elisabeth, his future bride, then a girl of ten, but apparently the meeting made little impression.

Following Austria's victory over the Italians at Custoza in late July 1848, the court felt it safe to return to Vienna, and Franz Joseph travelled with them. But within a few weeks Vienna again appeared unsafe, and in September the court left once more, this time for Olomouc (Olmütz) in Moravia. By now, Prince Alfred I of Windisch-Grätz, an influential military commander in Bohemia, was determined to see the young Archduke soon put on the throne. It was thought that a new ruler would not be bound by the oaths to respect constitutional government to which Ferdinand had been forced to agree, and that it was necessary to find a young, energetic emperor to replace the kindly but mentally unfit Ferdinand.

By the abdication of his uncle Ferdinand and the renunciation of his father (the mild-mannered Franz Karl), Franz Joseph succeeded as Emperor of Austria at Olomouc on 2 December 1848. At this time, he first became known by his second as well as his first Christian name. The name "Franz Joseph" was chosen to bring back memories of the new Emperor's great-granduncle, Emperor Joseph II (Holy Roman Emperor from 1765 to 1790), remembered as a modernising reformer.

Under the guidance of the new prime minister, Prince Schwarzenberg, the new emperor at first pursued a cautious course, granting a constitution in early 1849. At the same time, a military campaign was necessary against the Hungarians, who had rebelled against Habsburg central authority in the name of their ancient constitution. Franz Joseph was also almost immediately faced with a renewal of the fighting in Italy, with King Charles Albert of Sardinia taking advantage of setbacks in Hungary to resume the war in March 1849.

However, the military tide began to turn swiftly in favor of Franz Joseph and the Austrian whitecoats. Almost immediately, Charles Albert was decisively beaten by Radetzky at Novara and forced to sue for peace, as well as to renounce his throne.

Revolution in Hungary

The Hungarian reform laws (April laws) were based on the 12 points that established the fundaments of modern civil and political rights, economic and societal reforms in the Kingdom of Hungary.
The crucial turning point of the Hungarian events were the April laws which was ratified by his uncle King Ferdinand, however the new young Austrian monarch Francis Joseph arbitrarily "revoked" the laws without any legal competence. The monarchs had no right to revoke Hungarian parliamentary laws which were already signed.  This unconstitutional act irreversibly escalated the conflict between the Hungarian parliament and Francis Joseph. The Austrian Stadion Constitution was accepted by the Imperial Diet of Austria, where Hungary had no representation, and which traditionally had no legislative power in the territory of Kingdom of Hungary; despite this, it also tried to abolish the Diet of Hungary (which existed as the supreme legislative power in Hungary since the late 12th century.) 

The new Austrian constitution also went against the historical constitution of Hungary, and even tried to nullify it. These events represented a clear and obvious existential threat for the Hungarian state. The new constrained Stadion Constitution of Austria, the revocation of the April laws and the Austrian military campaign against Kingdom of Hungary resulted in the fall of the pacifist Batthyány government (which sought agreement with the court) and led to the sudden emergence of Lajos Kossuth's followers in the Hungarian parliament, who demanded the full independence of Hungary. On 7 March 1849 an imperial proclamation was issued in the name of the emperor Francis Joseph, according to the new proclamation, the territory of Kingdom of Hungary would be carved up and administered by five military districts, while Principality of Transylvania would be reestablished. The Austrian military intervention in the Kingdom of Hungary resulted in strong anti-Habsburg sentiment among Hungarians, thus the events in Hungary grew into a war for total independence from the Habsburg dynasty.

Constitutional and legitimacy problems in Hungary
Unlike other Habsburg ruled areas, the Kingdom of Hungary had an old historic constitution, which limited the power of the Crown and had greatly increased the authority of the parliament since the 13th century.
On 7 December 1848, the Diet of Hungary formally refused to acknowledge the title of the new king, "as without the knowledge and consent of the diet no one could sit on the Hungarian throne", and called the nation to arms. While in most Western European countries (like France and the United Kingdom) the monarch's reign began immediately upon the death of their predecessor, in Hungary the coronation was indispensable;  if it were not properly executed, the Kingdom remained "orphaned".

Even during the long personal union between the Kingdom of Hungary and other Habsburg ruled areas, the Habsburg monarchs had to be crowned as King of Hungary in order to promulgate laws there or exercise royal prerogatives in the territory of the Kingdom of Hungary.  From a legal point of view, according to the coronation oath, a crowned Hungarian King could not relinquish the Hungarian throne during his life; if the king was alive and unable to do his duty as ruler, a governor (or regent, as they would be called in English) had to assume the royal duties. Constitutionally, Franz Josef's uncle Ferdinand was still the legal king of Hungary. If there was no possibility to inherit the throne automatically due to the death of the predecessor king (since king Ferdinand was still alive), but the monarch wanted to relinquish his throne and appoint another king before his death, technically only one legal solution remained: the parliament had the power to dethrone the king and elect a new king. Due to the legal and military tensions, the Hungarian parliament did not grant Franz Joseph that favour.  This event gave to the revolt an excuse of legality. Actually, from this time until the collapse of the revolution, Lajos Kossuth (as elected regent-president) became the de facto and de jure ruler of Hungary.

Military difficulties in Hungary

In Hungary, the situation was more severe and Austrian defeat seemed imminent. Sensing a need to secure his right to rule, Franz Joseph sought help from Russia, requesting the intervention of Tsar Nicholas I of Russia, in order "to prevent the Hungarian insurrection developing into a European calamity".
Tsar Nicholas supported Franz Joseph in the name of the Holy Alliance, and sent a 200,000 strong army with 80,000 auxiliary forces. Finally, the joint army of Russian and Austrian forces defeated the Hungarian forces. After the restoration of Habsburg power, Hungary was placed under brutal martial law.

Russian troops entered Hungary in support of the Austrians and the revolution was crushed by late summer of 1849. With order now restored throughout his Empire, Franz Joseph felt free to renege on the constitutional concessions he had made, especially as the Austrian parliament meeting at Kremsier had behaved—in the young Emperor's eyes—abominably. The 1849 constitution was suspended, and a policy of absolutist centralism was established, guided by the Minister of the Interior, Alexander Bach.

Assassination attempt in 1853

On 18 February 1853, Franz Joseph survived an assassination attempt by Hungarian nationalist János Libényi. The emperor was taking a stroll with one of his officers, Count Maximilian Karl Lamoral O'Donnell, on a city bastion, when Libényi approached him. He immediately struck the emperor from behind with a knife straight at the neck. Franz Joseph almost always wore a uniform, which had a high collar that almost completely enclosed the neck. The collars of uniforms at that time were made from very sturdy material, precisely to counter this kind of attack. Even though the Emperor was wounded and bleeding, the collar saved his life. Count O'Donnell struck Libényi down with his sabre.

O'Donnell, hitherto only a Count by virtue of his Irish nobility (as a descendant of the Irish noble dynasty O'Donnell of Tyrconnell), was made a Count of the Habsburg monarchy (Reichsgraf). Another witness who happened to be nearby, the butcher Joseph Ettenreich, swiftly overpowered Libényi. For his deed he was later elevated to the nobility by the Emperor and became Joseph von Ettenreich. Libényi was subsequently put on trial and condemned to death for attempted regicide. He was executed on the Simmeringer Heide.

After this unsuccessful attack, the Emperor's brother Archduke Ferdinand Maximilian, later Emperor of Mexico, called upon Europe's royal families for donations to construct a new church on the site of the attack. The church was to be a votive offering for the survival of the Emperor. It is located on Ringstraße in the district of Alsergrund close to the University of Vienna, and is known as the Votivkirche. The survival of Franz Joseph was also commemorated in Prague by erecting a new statue of St. Francis of Assisi, the patron saint of the emperor, on Charles Bridge. It was donated by Count Franz Anton von Kolowrat-Liebsteinsky, the first minister-president of the Austrian Empire.

Consolidation of domestic policy

The next few years saw the seeming recovery of Austria's position on the international scene following the near disasters of 1848–1849. Under Schwarzenberg's guidance, Austria was able to stymie Prussian scheming to create a new German Federation under Prussian leadership, excluding Austria. After Schwarzenberg's premature death in 1852, he could not be replaced by statesmen of equal stature, and the Emperor himself effectively took over as prime minister.  He was one of the most prominent Roman Catholic rulers in Europe, and a fierce enemy of Freemasonry

Austro-Hungarian Compromise of 1867

The 1850s witnessed several failures of Austrian external policy: the Crimean War, the dissolution of its alliance with Russia, and defeat in the Second Italian War of Independence. The setbacks continued in the 1860s with defeat in the Austro-Prussian War of 1866, which resulted in the Austro-Hungarian Compromise of 1867.

The Hungarian political leaders had two main goals during the negotiations. One was to regain the traditional status (both legal and political) of the Hungarian state, which was lost after the Hungarian Revolution of 1848. The other was to restore the series of reform laws of the revolutionary parliament of 1848, which were based on the 12 points that established modern civil and political rights, economic and societal reforms in Hungary.

The Compromise partially re-established the sovereignty of the Kingdom of Hungary, separate from, and no longer subject to the Austrian Empire. Instead, it was regarded as an equal partner with Austria. The compromise put an end to 18 years of absolutist rule and military dictatorship which had been introduced by Francis Joseph after the Hungarian Revolution of 1848. Franz Joseph was crowned King of Hungary on 8 June, and on 28 July he promulgated the laws that officially turned the Habsburg domains into the Dual Monarchy of Austria-Hungary.

According to Emperor Franz Joseph, "There were three of us who made the agreement: Deák, Andrássy and myself."

Political difficulties in Austria mounted continuously through the late 19th century and into the 20th century. However, Franz Joseph remained immensely respected; the Emperor's patriarchal authority held the Empire together while the politicians squabbled among themselves.

Bohemian question

Following the accession of Franz Joseph to the throne in 1848, the political representatives of the Kingdom of Bohemia hoped and insisted that account should be taken of their historical state rights in the upcoming constitution. They felt the position of Bohemia within the Habsburg monarchy should have been highlighted by a coronation of the new ruler to the king of Bohemia in Prague (the last coronation took place in 1836). However, before the 19th century the Habsburgs had ruled Bohemia by hereditary right and a separate coronation was not deemed necessary.

His new government installed the system of neoabsolutism in Austrian internal affairs to make the Austrian Empire a unitary, centralised and bureaucratically administered state. When Franz Joseph returned to constitutional rule after the debacles in Italy at Magenta and Solferino and summoned the diets of his lands, the question of his coronation as king of Bohemia again returned to the agenda, as it had not since 1848. On 14 April 1861, Emperor Franz Joseph received a delegation from the Bohemian Diet with his words (in Czech):

In contrast to his predecessor Emperor Ferdinand (who spent the rest of his life after his abdication in 1848 in Bohemia and especially in Prague), Franz Joseph was never crowned separately as king of Bohemia. In 1861, the negotiations failed because of unsolved constitutional problems. However, in 1866, a visit of the monarch to Prague following the defeat at Hradec Králové (Königgrätz) was a huge success, testified by the considerable numbers of new photographs taken.

In 1867, the Austro-Hungarian compromise and the introduction of the dual monarchy left the Czechs and their aristocracy without the recognition of separate Bohemian state rights for which they had hoped. Bohemia remained Austrian Crown Lands. In Bohemia, opposition to dualism took the form of isolated street demonstrations, resolutions from district representations, and even open air mass protest meetings, confined to the biggest cities, such as Prague. The Czech newspaper Národní listy, complained that the Czechs had not yet been compensated for their wartime losses and sufferings during the Austro-Prussian War, and had just seen their historic state rights tossed aside and their land subsumed into the "other" half of the Austro-Hungarian Monarchy, commonly called "Cisleithania".

The Czech hopes were revived again in 1870–1871. In an Imperial Rescript of 26 September 1870, Franz Joseph referred again to the prestige and glory of the Bohemian Crown and to his intention to hold a coronation. Under Minister-President Karl Hohenwart in 1871, the government of Cisleithania negotiated a series of fundamental articles spelling out the relationship of the Bohemian Crown to the rest of the Habsburg Monarchy. On 12 September 1871, Franz Joseph announced:

For the planned coronation, the composer Bedřich Smetana had written the opera Libuše, but the ceremony did not take place. The creation of the German Empire, domestic opposition from German-speaking liberals (especially German-Bohemians) and from Hungarians doomed the Fundamental Articles. Hohenwart resigned and nothing changed.

Many Czech people were waiting for political changes in monarchy, including Tomáš Garrigue Masaryk and others. Masaryk served in the Reichsrat (Upper House) from 1891 to 1893 in the Young Czech Party and again from 1907 to 1914 in the Realist Party (which he had founded in 1900), but he did not campaign for the independence of Czechs and Slovaks from Austria-Hungary. In Vienna in 1909 he helped Hinko Hinković's defense in the fabricated trial against prominent Croats and Serbs members of the Serbo-Croatian Coalition (such as Frano Supilo and Svetozar Pribićević), and others, who were sentenced to more than 150 years and a number of death penalties. The Bohemian question would remain unresolved for the entirety of Franz Joseph's reign.

Foreign policy

German question

The main foreign policy goal of Franz Joseph had been the unification of Germany under the House of Habsburg. This was justified on grounds of precedence; from 1452 to the end of the Holy Roman Empire in 1806, with only one period of interruption under the Wittelsbachs, the Habsburgs had generally held the German crown. However, Franz Joseph's desire to retain the non-German territories of the Habsburg Austrian Empire in the event of German unification proved problematic.

Two factions quickly developed: a party of German intellectuals favouring a Greater Germany (Großdeutschland) under the House of Habsburg; the other favouring a Lesser Germany (Kleindeutschland). The Greater Germans favoured the inclusion of Austria in a new all-German state on the grounds that Austria had always been a part of Germanic empires, that it was the leading power of the German Confederation, and that it would be absurd to exclude eight million Austrian Germans from an all-German nation state. The champions of a lesser Germany argued against the inclusion of Austria on the grounds that it was a multi-nation state, not a German one, and that its inclusion would bring millions of non-Germans into the German nation state.

If Greater Germany were to prevail, the crown would necessarily have to go to Franz Joseph, who had no desire to cede it in the first place to anyone else. On the other hand, if the idea of a smaller Germany won out, the German crown could of course not possibly go to the Emperor of Austria, but would naturally be offered to the head of the largest and most powerful German state outside of Austria—the King of Prussia. The contest between the two ideas, quickly developed into a contest between Austria and Prussia. After Prussia decisively won the Seven Weeks War, this question was solved; Austria lost no territories to Prussia as long as they remained out of German affairs.

Three Emperors League 

In 1873, two years after the unification of Germany, Franz Joseph entered into the League of Three Emperors (Dreikaiserbund) with Kaiser Wilhelm I of Germany and Tsar Alexander II of Russia, who was succeeded by Tsar Alexander III in 1881. The league had been designed by the German chancellor Otto von Bismarck, as an attempt to maintain the peace of Europe. It would last intermittently until 1887.

Vatican 
In 1903, Franz Joseph's veto of Jus exclusivae of Cardinal Mariano Rampolla's election to the papacy was transmitted to the Papal conclave by Cardinal Jan Puzyna de Kosielsko. It was the last use of such a veto, as the new Pope Pius X prohibited future uses and provided for excommunication for any attempt.

Bosnia and Herzegovina 

During the mid-1870s a series of violent rebellions against Ottoman rule broke out in the Balkans, and the Turks responded with equally violent and oppressive reprisals. Tsar Alexander II of Russia, wanting to intervene against the Ottomans, sought and obtained an agreement with Austria-Hungary.

In the Budapest Conventions of 1877, the two powers agreed that Russia would annex Bessarabia, and Austria-Hungary would observe a benevolent neutrality toward Russia in the pending war with the Turks. As compensation for this support, Russia agreed to Austria-Hungary's annexation of Bosnia-Herzegovina. A scant 15 months later, the Russians imposed on the Ottomans the Treaty of San Stefano, which reneged on the Budapest accord and declared that Bosnia-Herzegovina would be jointly occupied by Russian and Austrian troops.

The treaty was overturned by the 1878 Treaty of Berlin, which allowed sole Austrian occupation of Bosnia-Herzegovina but did not specify a final disposition of the provinces. That omission was addressed in the Three Emperors' League agreement of 1881, when both Germany and Russia endorsed Austria's right to annex Bosnia-Herzegovina. However, by 1897, under a new tsar, the Russian Imperial government had again withdrawn its support for Austrian annexation of Bosnia-Herzegovina. The Russian foreign minister, Count Michael Muraviev, stated that an Austrian annexation of Bosnia-Herzegovina would raise "an extensive question requiring special scrutiny".

In 1908, the Russian foreign minister, Alexander Izvolsky, offered Russian support, for the third time, for the annexation of Bosnia and Herzegovina by Austria-Hungary, in exchange for Austrian support for the opening of the Bosporus Strait and the Dardanelles to Russian warships. Austria's foreign minister, Alois von Aehrenthal, pursued this offer vigorously, resulting in the quid pro quo understanding with Izvolsky, reached on 16 September 1908 at the Buchlau Conference. However, Izvolsky made this agreement with Aehrenthal without the knowledge of Tsar Nicholas II or his government in St. Petersburg, or any of the other foreign powers including Britain, France and Serbia.

Based upon the assurances of the Buchlau Conference and the treaties that preceded it, Franz Joseph signed the proclamation announcing the annexation of Bosnia-Herzegovina into the Empire on 6 October 1908. However a diplomatic crisis erupted, as both the Serbs and the Italians demanded compensation for the annexation, which the Austro-Hungarian government refused to entertain. The incident was not resolved until the revision of the Treaty of Berlin in April 1909, exacerbating tensions between Austria-Hungary and the Serbs.

Outbreak of World War I

On 28 June 1914 Franz Joseph's nephew and heir-presumptive Archduke Franz Ferdinand, and his morganatic wife Sophie, Duchess of Hohenberg, were assassinated by Gavrilo Princip, a Yugoslav nationalist of Serbian ethnicity, during a visit to Sarajevo. When he heard the news of the assassination, Franz Joseph said that "one has not to defy the Almighty. In this manner a superior power has restored that order which I unfortunately was unable to maintain."

While the emperor was shaken, and interrupted his holiday to return to Vienna, he soon resumed his vacation at his imperial villa at Bad Ischl. Initial decision-making during the "July Crisis" fell to Count Leopold Berchtold, the Austrian foreign minister; Count Franz Conrad von Hötzendorf, the chief of staff for the Austro-Hungarian army and the other ministers. The ultimate resolution of deliberations by the Austrian government during the weeks following the assassination of the Archduke was to give Serbia an ultimatum of itemized demands with which it was virtually certain Serbia would be unable or unwilling to comply, thus serving as a "legal basis for war".

A week after delivery of the Austrian ultimatum to Serbia, on 28 July, war was declared. Within weeks, the Germans, Russians, French and British had all entered the fray which eventually became known as World War I. On 6 August, Franz Joseph signed the declaration of war against Russia.

Death

Franz Joseph died in the Schönbrunn Palace on the evening of 21 November 1916, at the age of 86. His death was a result of developing pneumonia of the right lung several days after catching a cold while walking in Schönbrunn Park with the King of Bavaria. He was succeeded by his grand-nephew Charles I & IV, who reigned until the collapse of the Empire following its defeat at the end of the First World War in 1918.

He is buried in the Imperial Crypt in Vienna.

Family 

It was generally felt in the court that the Emperor should marry and produce heirs as soon as possible. Various potential brides were considered, including Princess Elisabeth of Modena, Princess Anna of Prussia and Princess Sidonia of Saxony. Although in public life Franz Joseph was the unquestioned director of affairs, in his private life his mother still wielded crucial influence. Sophie wanted to strengthen the relationship between the Houses of Habsburg and Wittelsbach—descending from the latter house herself—and hoped to match Franz Joseph with her sister Ludovika's eldest daughter, Helene ("Néné"), who was four years the Emperor's junior.

However, Franz Joseph fell deeply in love with Néné's younger sister Elisabeth ("Sisi"), a beautiful girl of fifteen, and insisted on marrying her instead. Sophie acquiesced, despite her misgivings about Sisi's appropriateness as an imperial consort, and the young couple were married on 24 April 1854 in St. Augustine's Church, Vienna.

Their marriage would eventually prove to be an unhappy one; though Franz Joseph was passionately in love with his wife, the feeling was not mutual. Elisabeth never truly acclimatized to life at court, and was frequently in conflict with the imperial family. Their first daughter Sophie died as an infant, and their only son Rudolf died by suicide in 1889 in the infamous Mayerling Incident.

In 1885 Franz Joseph met Katharina Schratt, a leading actress of the Vienna stage, and she became his friend and confidante. This relationship lasted the rest of his life, and was—to a certain degree—tolerated by Elisabeth. Franz Joseph built Villa Schratt in Bad Ischl for her, and also provided her with a small palace in Vienna. Though their relationship lasted for thirty-four years, it remained platonic.

The Empress was an inveterate traveller, horsewoman, and fashion maven who was rarely seen in Vienna. Sisi was obsessed about preserving her beauty, carrying out many bizarre routines and strenuous exercise, and as a result suffered from ill health. She was stabbed to death by an Italian anarchist in 1898 while on a visit to Geneva. A few days after the funeral, Robert of Parma wrote in a letter to his friend Tirso de Olazábal that "It was pitiful to look at the Emperor, he showed a great deal of energy in his immense pain, but at times one could see all the immensity of his grief." Franz Joseph never fully recovered from the loss. According to the future empress Zita of Bourbon-Parma he told his relatives: "You'll never know how important she was to me" or, according to some sources, "You will never know how much I loved this woman."

Relationship with Franz Ferdinand

Archduke Franz Ferdinand became heir presumptive (Thronfolger) to the throne of Austria-Hungary in 1896, after the deaths of his cousin Rudolf (in 1889) and his father Karl Ludwig (in 1896). The relationship between him and Franz Joseph had always been a fairly contentious one, which was further exacerbated when Franz Ferdinand announced his desire to marry Countess Sophie Chotek. The emperor would not even consider giving his blessing to the union, as Sophie was merely of noble rank, not dynastic rank.

Although the emperor received letters from members of the imperial family throughout the fall and winter of 1899 beseeching him to relent, Franz Joseph stood his ground. He finally gave his consent in 1900. However, the marriage was to be morganatic, and any children of the marriage would be ineligible to succeed to the throne. The couple were married on 1 July 1900 at Reichstadt. The emperor did not attend the wedding, nor did any of the archdukes. After that, the two men disliked and mistrusted each other.

Following the assassination of Franz Ferdinand and Sophie in 1914, Franz Joseph's daughter, Marie Valerie, noted that her father expressed his greater confidence in the new heir presumptive, his grandnephew Archduke Charles. The emperor admitted to his daughter, regarding the assassination: "For me, it is a relief from a great worry."

Titles, styles, honours and arms

Name
Franz Joseph's names in the languages of his empire were:

Titles and styles
 18 August 1830 – 2 December 1848: His Imperial and Royal Highness Archduke and Prince Francis Joseph of Austria, Prince of Hungary, Bohemia and Croatia
 2 December 1848 – 21 November 1916: His Imperial and Royal Apostolic Majesty The Emperor of Austria, Apostolic King of Hungary

His official grand title after the Ausgleich of 1867 was: "Francis Joseph the First, by the Grace of God Emperor of Austria, Apostolic King of Hungary, King of Bohemia, King of Dalmatia, Croatia, Slavonia, Galicia and Lodomeria and Illyria; King of Jerusalem etc., Archduke of Austria; Grand Duke of Tuscany and Cracow, Duke of Lorraine, of Salzburg, Styria, Carinthia, Carniola and of Bukovina; Grand Prince of Transylvania; Margrave of Moravia; Duke of Upper and Lower Silesia, of Modena, Parma, Piacenza and Guastalla, of Oświęcim, Zator and Ćeszyn, Friuli, Ragusa (Dubrovnik) and Zara (Zadar); Princely Count of Habsburg and Tyrol, of Kyburg, Gorizia and Gradisca; Prince of Trent (Trento) and Brixen; Margrave of Upper and Lower Lusatia and in Istria; Count of Hohenems, Feldkirch, Bregenz, Sonnenberg, etc.; Lord of Trieste, of Cattaro (Kotor), and over the Windic march; Grand Voivode of the Voivodship of Serbia."

Honours

National decorations
 Knight of the Golden Fleece, 1844; Chief and Sovereign, 2 December 1848 (Orden vom Goldenen Vlies, ex officio as Emperor of Austria)
 Grand Master of the Military Order of Maria Theresa (Militär Maria-Theresien-Orden, ex officio as Emperor of Austria)
 Grand Master of the Royal Hungarian Order of St. Stephen (Königlich ungarischer St. Stephan-Orden, ex officio as Emperor of Austria)
 Grand Master of the Austrian Imperial Order of Leopold (Leopold-Orden, ex officio as Emperor of Austria)
 Grand Master of the Imperial Order of the Iron Crown (Orden der Eisernen Krone, ex officio as Emperor of Austria)

In addition, he founded the Order of Franz Joseph (Franz Joseph-Orden) on 2 December 1849, and the Order of Elizabeth (Elizabeth-Orden) in 1898.

Foreign decorations

Honorary appointments
 Honorary General of the Swedish Army, 1888
 Colonel-in-chief of the 1st (The King's) Dragoon Guards, British Army, 25 March 1896 – 1914
 Colonel-in-chief of the Kexholm Life Guards Grenadier Regiment, Russian Army, until 26 June 1914
 Colonel-in-chief of the 12th Belgorod Lancer Regiment, Russian Army, until 26 June 1914
 Colonel-in-chief of the 16th (Schleswig-Holstein) Hussars, German Army
 Colonel-in-chief of the 122nd (Emperor Francis Joseph of Austria, King of Hungary (4th Württemberg) Fusiliers
 Field Marshal of the British Army, 1 September 1903 – 1914

Arms and monogram

Legacy

Franz Joseph Land in the Russian Arctic was named in his honour in 1873 by the Austro-Hungarian North Pole expedition which first reported finding it. The Franz Joseph Glacier in New Zealand's South Island also bears his name.

Franz Joseph founded in 1872 the Franz Joseph University (Hungarian: Ferenc József Tudományegyetem, Romanian: Universitatea Francisc Iosif) in the city of Cluj-Napoca (at that time a part of Austria-Hungary under the name of Kolozsvár). The university was moved to Szeged after Cluj became a part of Romania, becoming the University of Szeged.

In certain areas, celebrations are still being held in remembrance of Franz Joseph's birthday. The Mitteleuropean People's Festival takes place every year around 18 August, and is a "spontaneous, traditional and brotherly meeting among peoples of the Central-European Countries". The event includes ceremonies, meetings, music, songs, dances, wine and food tasting, and traditional costumes and folklore from Mitteleuropa.

Personal motto
 "With united forces" (as the Emperor of Austria) –  – 
 "My trust in [the ancient] virtue" (as the Apostolic King of Hungary) –  –

Issue
 Archduchess Sophie of Austria; 5 March 1855 – 29 May 1857.
 Archduchess Gisela of Austria; 12 July 1856 – 27 July 1932. Married Prince Leopold of Bavaria (second cousin) in 1873; had issue.
 Rudolf, Crown Prince of Austria; 21 August 1858 – 30 January 1889. Married Princess Stephanie of Belgium in 1881; had issue. Died in a murder–suicide.
 Archduchess Marie Valerie of Austria; 22 April 1868 – 6 September 1924. Married Archduke Franz Salvator, Prince of Tuscany (second cousin) in 1890; had issue

Ancestry

See also
 Family tree of German monarchs – he was related to every other ruler of Germany
 List of coupled cousins
 Austro-Hungarian entry into World War I
 Franc Jozeph Island, island in Albania named in honor of the Emperor.
 Order of St. George (Habsburg-Lorraine)

Citations

General bibliography

Further reading

 
 
 
 Bridge, F. R. (1972). From Sadowa to Sarajevo: the foreign policy of Austria–Hungary, 1866–1914.
 
 
 
 
 ; politics and diplomacy
 Tschuppik, Karl (1930). The reign of the Emperor Francis Joseph.

External links

 
 
 

 
1830 births
1916 deaths
19th-century Emperors of Austria
20th-century Emperors of Austria
19th-century Archdukes of Austria
Articles containing video clips
Austrian Roman Catholics
Burials at the Imperial Crypt
Deaths from pneumonia in Austria-Hungary
Dukes of Carniola
Field marshals of Austria
Grand Croix of the Légion d'honneur
Grand Crosses of the Military Order of Maria Theresa
Grand Crosses of the Military Order of Max Joseph
Grand Crosses of the Order of the Star of Romania
Grand Masters of the Order of the Golden Fleece
House of Habsburg-Lorraine
Hunters
Knights Grand Cross of the Military Order of William
Knights Grand Cross of the Order of Saints Maurice and Lazarus
Knights Grand Cross of the Royal Order of Kalākaua
Knights of Malta
Knights of the Golden Fleece of Austria
Knights of the Holy Sepulchre
Knights of the Order of Saint Joseph
Knights of the Order of the Norwegian Lion
Nobility from Vienna
People of the Revolutions of 1848
Recipients of the Order of Bravery, 1st class
Recipients of the Order of Franz Joseph
Recipients of the Order of Saint Stephen of Hungary
Recipients of the Order of St. Anna, 1st class
Recipients of the Order of St. George of the Fourth Degree
Recipients of the Order of the Cross of Takovo
Recipients of the Order of the White Eagle (Russia)
Recipients of the Pour le Mérite (military class)
Grand Crosses of the Order of Saint-Charles
Stabbing survivors
Military personnel from Vienna